Franciszek Andrzej Bobola Biberstein-Starowieyski (8 July 1930 in Bratkówka – 23 February 2009 in Warsaw) was a Polish artist. From 1949 to 1955, he studied at the Academy of Fine Arts in Kraków and Warsaw. He specialized in poster, drawing, painting, stage designing, and book illustration. He was a member of Alliance Graphique International (AGI). Throughout his career his style deviated from the socialist realism that was prevalent during the start of his career and the popular, brightly colored Cyrk posters; however he did create one Cyrk poster Homage to Picasso in 1966.

He was the first Polish artist to have a one-man show at the Museum of Modern Art (MoMA) in New York, in 1986.

Major awards
 1973 - Award, International Biennale of the Arts, São Paulo (Brazil)
 1974 - Film poster award, Cannes Film Festival, Cannes (France)
 1974 - 2nd Prize, International Biennial of Posters, Warsaw (Poland)
 1978 - 2nd Prize, International Biennial of Posters, Warsaw (Poland)
 1979 - Gold Plaque, International Film Festival, Chicago (USA)
 1982 - Silver Hugo, Film poster competition
 2000 - 3rd Prize, International Biennial of Posters, Warsaw (Poland)
Source

Major exhibitions
 1986 – The Museum of Modern Art, New York (USA)
 2014 - Panstwowa Galeria Sztuki, Sopot (Pol.) "Franciszek Starowieyski Przyjaznie Paryskie 1683-1693", Kolekeja Nelson et Alin Avila

Books

 1984
"F.s Franciszek Strarowieyski posters 1973/1984", edited by Area
 1993
"F.s 1690 Franciszek Starowieyski", lithography, edited by Area
 1994
"Mélange n°7", lithography, edited by Area 
 2014
"Franciszek Starowieyski Przyjaznie Paryskie 1683-1693", edited by Panstwowa Galeria Sztuki, by Alin Avila. 
 2017
Nombreuses affiches de Franciszek Starowieyski sur lesaffiches.com

See also
List of graphic designers
List of Polish painters
List of Polish graphic designers
Graphic design

References

Further reading
Kempa, Karolina (2018), Polnische Kulturplakate im Sozialismus. Eine kunstsoziologische Untersuchung zur (Be-)Deutung des Werkes von Jan Lenica und Franciszek Starowieyski, Wiesbaden: Springer, 

1930 births
2009 deaths
Polish graphic designers
Polish poster artists